Baranovka is a rural locality (a settlement) in Baybeksky Selsoviet, Krasnoyarsky District, Astrakhan Oblast, Russia. The population was 41 as of 2010. There is 1 street.

Geography 
Baranovka is located 3 km north of Krasny Yar (the district's administrative centre) by road. Mayachnoye is the nearest rural locality.

References 

Rural localities in Krasnoyarsky District, Astrakhan Oblast